Fengman District is a district of Jilin City, Jilin, People's Republic of China.

Administrative divisions

Subdistricts:
Shijingou Subdistrict, Hongqi Subdistrict, Jiangnan Subdistrict, Dachangtun Subdistrict, Gaoxin Subdistrict

The only town is Wangqi

Townships:
Fengman Township, Xiaobaishan Township, Qian'erdao Township, Jiangnan Township

References

External links

Jilin City
County-level divisions of Jilin